On 13 February 2017, Jamaat-ul-Ahrar released a video announcing the launch of "Operation Ghazi", named after Abdul Rashid Ghazi who was killed in July 2007 inside the Lal Masjid. The operation started with the suicide bombing at the Mall, in which 12 civilians and six police officers were killed.

In the video, Jamaat-ul-Ahrar stated that its future targets would be legislative bodies Pakistan Army, intelligence agencies and supporting institutions; interest-based economic institutions; INGOs/NGOs and civil society organisations involved in the advocacy of human rights, women's rights and community awareness campaigns; liberal writers, political leaders and workers; media persons; and coeducational private schools, colleges and universities.

The Centrum Media released a video statement from Abdul Rashid Ghazi's son, Haroon Rasheed Ghazi, addressing Jamaat-ul-Ahrar. "We should come up with a political solution. This bloodshed is not in the interest of anyone. Our stance is very clear; we do not endorse any violent activities," he said.

Operation Radd ul Fasaad
On 22 February 2017, in response to the Operation Ghazi, Pakistan Army launched Operation Radd-ul-Fasaad (lit. "Elimination of Discord") across the country. The operation aimed at indiscriminately eliminating residual threat of terrorism and consolidating gains of operations made so far. It further aimed at ensuring security of the borders. The countrywide de-weaponisation and explosive control were laid as the additional objectives of the operation.

Timeline

2017

February 2017
On 13 February 2017, a suicide bombing took place on the Mall in Lahore, where a group of chemists and pharmaceutical personnel were demonstrating at the Charing Cross.
The same day, 2 officers of the Bomb Disposal Squad (BDS) were killed and 12 others were injured, when a bomb BDS personnel were trying to defuse went off. The bomb was placed near Karachi Stop on Saryab road, Quetta.
On 15 February 2017, two attacks occurred in Ghalanai and Peshawar. In the first attack in Ghalanai, a suicide bomber killed three policemen and two civilians near an administrative building in the Federally Administered Tribal Areas. An accomplice was shot and killed. A second suicide bomber failed to cause any casualties when his suicide vest detonated prematurely.

In the Peshawar bombing, a vehicle carrying local judges and government officials was targeted by suicide bombers. The driver and a civilian were killed and five others were injured.

 On 16 February, the Punjab Police's Counter Terrorism Department raided a Jamaat-ul-Ahrar hideout in Multan and killed 6 militants, who had resisted the operation with firing and explosives.
 On 21 February 2017, suicide bombers targeted a sessions court in Tangi, Charsadda District. Seven persons were killed and 21 were injured.

March 2017
On 5 March 2017, Pakistani military confirmed that 10 militants were killed and five soldiers lost their lives in attacks that took place in Mohmand Agency.
On 17 March 2017, al-Jazeera reported that Jamaat-ur-Ahrar militants attacked a Pakistani military border post in Khyber Pakhtunkhwa from Afghanistan, killing two Pakistani soldiers. Six militants were also killed. Also that day a military operation in Rajgal Valley killed "several" LeI fighters, according to the Pakistani military media wing. Pakistan's military said it had foiled an attempted suicide attack on a paramilitary training centre in Shabqadar, in the northwestern Khyber Pakhtunkhwa province, two suicide bombers and a soldier were killed in the attempted attack, while another soldier was wounded.
On 31 March 2017, at least 22 people have been killed and more than 70 injured in a blast outside a mosque in north-west Pakistan. Jamaat-ul-Ahrar claimed responsibility for the attack.

References

2010s in Pakistan
Civil wars involving the states and peoples of Asia
Conflicts in 2017
Religion-based civil wars
Insurgency in Khyber Pakhtunkhwa
War on terror
Wars involving Pakistan
Jamaat-ul-Ahrar
Jamaat-ul-Ahrar attacks